Kändishoppet is a Swedish celebrity diving show broadcast on TV3 based on the international reality television series Celebrity Splash!. Presenters are Adam Alsing and Carin da Silva. It has so far run for two seasons. Season 1 in 2013 was won by Swedish television host on TV4 and magician Tobbe Blom. The following season also in 2013 was won by Swedish professional wrestler and entertainer Frank Andersson.

References

TV3 (Sweden) original programming